Stein Arve Ytterdahl (born 4 October 1951) is a Norwegian politician and public servant. He served as the County Governor of Agder county from 2016 until 2022.

Ytterdahl was born in Namsos in 1951 and he received a degree in civil engineering in 1975 from the Norwegian University of Science and Technology in Trondheim. During his career, he worked in various management positions at Norsk Hydro in Porsgrunn and then Karmøy, at Elkem at the Lista Smeltverk and then as the CEO of Sauda Smelteverk. He also worked for Statoil, Bredero Price Norway, and Boliden AB in Odda. He also spent two years as the director of higher education at the BI Norwegian Business School.

He was a member of the Norwegian Labour Party. From 2007 until 2011, he served as the mayor of Farsund Municipality. From 2012 until 2015, he was a councilor for Trondheim Municipality. In 2016, he was named to the newly created post of County Governor of Aust- og Vest-Agder. The new post combined the old offices of County Governor of Aust-Agder and County Governor of Vest-Agder into one joint office in preparation for the planned merger of the two counties into Agder county in 2020. In 2020, his title changed to County Governor of Agder.

References

1951 births
Living people
County governors of Norway
Labour Party (Norway) politicians
Mayors of places in Vest-Agder